Sheetster  is a GPL open-source Web Spreadsheet and a Java Application Server created by Extentech Inc. The product was created for the enterprise and small and medium-sized businesses as an Open Source alternative to closed document management systems.

History 
Built by Extentech Inc, a developer of Java spreadsheet and development tools, Sheetster BETA was made available to the public on June 8, 2007.

Features 
 Output to PDF
 Total Compatibility with Excel 1997–2007 Files (BIFF8 and XLSX Spreadsheets)
 Embed YouTube videos in your Spreadsheets
 Publish Spreadsheets as RSS with R3S
 Instant Web2.0 Apps with Forms, Charts, and Macros
 Role-based security and sharing

Sheetster runs on the ExtenXLS Java (programming language) Spreadsheet SDK and includes:

The Sheetster administration console allows for the design of relational data objects using a visual query designer and object-relational mapper. The RESTful API accepts data from a variety of sources, and outputs data-mapped spreadsheet objects in a variety of formats including JSON, XML, and as Excel-compatible XLS. 
Sheetster can be automated with macros and automatic data entry forms created from Excel cell ranges. Data Objects can be mapped to spreadsheet templates and output in a variety of formats:
 Excel 2007 Spreadsheet (.xlsx/.ooxml)
 Excel Binary Spreadsheet (.xls)CSV
 ExtenXLS XML Doc (.exml)
 Archive All Spreadsheets (.zip)
 XSLT Transform
 CSV

Usage 

Most common usages of sheetster:
 As a hosted web spreadsheet: www.sheetster.com
 As a web service embedded within other applications
 Spreadsheet calculations—used as secure formula engines within Web 2.0 and traditional client-server web applications.

Storage 
Sheetster can be stored in any database or file system of choice, such as:
 SaaS online access
 Local host server for offline access
 Behind the firewall
 On Amazon S3

Integration 
Integration is achieved through the RESTful API which allows for publishing of data-mapped spreadsheet cells as web services. Sheetster provides integrated support for:
 Advanced server-based spreadsheet automation and functionality
 Alfresco ECM
 A REST API with JSON/XML/HTML/CSV/ and XLS output
 Sheetster Web Spreadsheet (source included)
 Built-in secure content management system
 ExtenXLS Java Spreadsheet SDK
 Customizable Java Swing administration GUI with Object-Relational Mapper and Query Builder

Integration guide

Sheetster is available for download at Extentech.com and Sourceforge.

Notes

References 
 Sheetster Open Source, anonymous author
 how-to-open-and-edit-excel-2007-xlsx-file-online,October 19, 2009, Walsh, Ivan
 Sheetster: Web based spreadsheets,August 23, 2009, White, Peter

External links
 Extentech

Sourceforge

Free spreadsheet software
Online spreadsheets